Maxime Rousseau (born 19 August 1991) is a French footballer who plays as a midfielder for Championnat National side Le Poiré-sur-Vie on loan from Angers SCO in Ligue 2.

References

1991 births
Living people
People from Château-Gontier
French footballers
Association football midfielders
Ligue 2 players
Angers SCO players
Sportspeople from Mayenne
Footballers from Pays de la Loire